L. A. Sohnke was a German mathematician who worked on the complex multiplication of elliptic functions.

References

19th-century German mathematicians